Jean-Pierre Bouyxou (born 16 January 1946) is a French film critic, author, filmmaker and actor.<ref>(French''')</ref>

Career
He started his career as a writer in 1964 when his article was published in fanzines (Mercury, Lunatique). Some other magazines he wrote for were Vampirella, Sex Stars System, Zoom (1969–1976), Métal hurlant, L'Écho des savanes, Penthouse, Lui, Hara-Kiri, Paris Match.

He was editor-in-chief of Fascination for thirty issues, from 1978 to 1986.

He participated in the happenings of Jean-Jacques Lebel.

He worked with Roland Lethem, Étienne O'Leary, Jesus Franco, Jean Rollin and Alain Payet.

Notes

External links
 

1946 births
Living people
French film critics
French male film actors
French film directors
French male non-fiction writers